Carhué is an Argentine town in the Province of Buenos Aires, head of the Municipality (Partido) of Adolfo Alsina.

Carhué was founded in 1877 and declared a city in 1949.

Translation of Carhué 
In the Mapuche language, Carhué means "Green Land" (CAR: from Green, and HUÉ: Land or Place).

Villa Epecuén 

Located several kilometres to the north of the town is Villa Epecuén, a former resort town that developed in the 1920s. The town was submerged by the lake in 1985, but the waters began to recede in 2009 and the town's ruins became visible. The area is accessible by road from Carhué.

Notable people
 

Amilcar Adrián Balercia (born 1967), Argentine former footballer

References

External links 

 Adolfo Alsina 
 Thermal Spas of Carhué 
  Broadcast 102.1 mz fm 
 The tourist Villa Epecuén 
 The Ruins of Villa Epecuen

Populated places in Buenos Aires Province
Populated places established in 1877
Adolfo Alsina Partido
1877 establishments in Argentina